Patrizia Fratini (born 27 July 1961) is an Italian gymnast. She competed in six events at the 1976 Summer Olympics.

References

External links
 

1961 births
Living people
Italian female artistic gymnasts
Olympic gymnasts of Italy
Gymnasts at the 1976 Summer Olympics
People from Prato
Sportspeople from the Province of Prato